The BMW Museum is an automobile museum of BMW history located near the  Olympiapark in Munich, Germany. The museum was established in 1973, shortly after the Summer Olympics opened. From 2004 to 2008, it was renovated in connection with the construction of the BMW Welt, directly opposite. The museum reopened on 21 June 2008. At the moment the exhibition space is 5,000 square metres for the presentation of about 120 exhibits.

Architecture and design

The "Time Horizon(s)" exhibition 
The museum shows BMW's technical development throughout the company's history. It contains engines and turbines, aircraft, motorcycles, and vehicles in a plethora of possible variations. In addition to actual models there are futuristic-looking, even conceptual studies from the past 20 years.

The use of headphones and clever, often indirect lighting, lend the exhibition a largely peaceful atmosphere. The emphasis is on technical development and benefits of modernity. The building blends in with the exhibition concept.

Figures 
The attendance figures are, after the Deutsches Museum and the Pinakothek der Moderne, the highest in Munich. About 250,000 people a year visit.

Architecture 
Known as the salad bowl or white cauldron, the silver futuristic building was designed by the architect of the BMW Headquarters, the Viennese professor Karl Schwanzer. The roughly circular base is only 20 meters in diameter, the flat roof about 40 metres. The entrance is on the ground floor and consists of a cloakroom (in basement) and reception. First, the visitor ascends on a spiral upward in the building to visit the exhibits. Slideshows and smaller, in-depth exhibits are located on four "islands" inside the building. After "looping" the actual exhibition visitors reach the upper floor, where there are individual exhibits, a small cinema hall and several interactive exhibits that explain the technology further. An escalator leads visitors finally back into the ground floor.

The design reverses the spiral from top to bottom and the order of the "operation principle" Frank Lloyd Wright built in Solomon R. Guggenheim Museum.

See also 
Automobilwerk Eisenach
History of BMW
BMW Group Classic
List of automobile museums
Rolls-Royce Museum
Mercedes-Benz Museum
Porsche Museum, Stuttgart

External links 

  
BMW Museum on Design Build Network
 

Buildings and structures completed in 1972
BMW
Tourist attractions in Munich
Museums in Munich
Automobile museums in Germany
Milbertshofen-Am Hart